Diego Alfredo Paulsen Kehr (born 1 August 1987) is a Chilean politician who served as the President of the Chamber of Deputies from 2020 to 2022, and as has been a member of the Chamber of Deputies since 2020, representing District 22 of Araucanía.

He is the youngest person to hold the position of President of the Chamber of Deputies, being elected in April 2020 at the age of 32. As President of the Chamber of Deputies, Paulsen is third in the presidential line of succession, after the Minister of the Interior and Public Security and the President of the Senate.

Paulsen was first elected to Congress in 2013 representing District 49 of Araucanía and then reelected in 2017 representing the newly created District 22. He is a member of the liberal conservative National Renewal Party.

Early life and education 

Paulsen was born in Temuco to a family of Danish and German descent. He graduated from Adolfo Ibáñez University with a law degree and earned a postgraduate diploma in law and parliamentary administration at the Pontifical Catholic University of Valparaíso.

Career 

Paulsen worked as a legal consultant for various businesses from 2007 to 2012. In 2012, he began working as a consultant for National Renewal's parliamentary committee. The following year, Paulsen won the primaries and became a congressional candidate for the 49th district of the Araucanía Region. Paulsen was elected with 26.26% of the votes and began his term as a member of the Chamber of Deputies in 2014.

Paulsen presided an investigative commission regarding the University of Art & Social Sciences (ARCIS) and its accreditation process. He was also part of an investigative commission regarding public spending on primary health care and hospital infrastructure.

In 2017, he was reelected to the Chamber of the Deputies representing the 22nd district of the Araucanía Region.

Political positions

Abortion 

Paulsen is against abortion. In 2017, he voted against a bill that sought to legalize abortion under special circumstances.

Death penalty 
In 2016, Paulsen voted in favor of a bill that attempted to reinstate the death penalty in Chile. The bill was rejected in the Chamber of Deputies with 111 votes against and 13 votes in favor.

Same-sex marriage 

In a 2014 interview with The Clinic, Paulsen stated that he was against same-sex marriage but in favor of civil unions.

Electoral history

2013 Parliamentary Elections 
 2013 parliamentary elections for deputy of District 49 (Curacautín, Galvarino, Lautaro, Lonquimay, Melipeuco, Perquenco, Victoria and Vilcún)

2017 Parliamentary Elections 
 2017 parliamentary elections for deputy of District 22 (Angol, Collipulli, Curacautín, Ercilla, Galvarino, Lautaro, Lonquimay, Los Sauces, Melipeuco, Perquenco, Purén, Renaico, Traiguén, Victoria and Vilcún)

References 

1987 births
Living people
People from Temuco
Members of the Chamber of Deputies of Chile
National Renewal (Chile) politicians
Presidents of the Chamber of Deputies of Chile
Chilean people of Danish descent
Chilean people of German descent
Pontifical Catholic University of Valparaíso alumni
21st-century Chilean lawyers
21st-century Chilean politicians
Adolfo Ibáñez University alumni
Chilean anti-abortion activists